Carlos David Moreno Hernández (born 14 June 1986), known as Carlos David, is a Spanish professional footballer who plays for Hércules CF as a central defender.

Football career
Born in Mérida, Badajoz, Extremadura, Carlos David graduated from Valencia CF's youth setup. He made his debuts as a senior with the reserves, appearing several seasons in Tercera División and Segunda División B.

On 20 July 2009, Carlos David signed for Belgian Pro League side R.E. Mouscron. He played his first match as a professional on 1 August, starting in a 2–1 away win against K.R.C. Genk. He scored his first professional goals on 5 December, netting a brace in a 2–1 success at K.S.V. Roeselare.

Carlos David left the club in late December 2009 due to its financial troubles, and joined Celta de Vigo's reserve team in the third level the following 15 January. He subsequently resumed his career in the same tier, representing CD Teruel, UD Melilla, FC Cartagena and SD Huesca; with the latter, he notably scored against FC Barcelona in the Copa del Rey, but in a 1–8 away defeat.

On 5 July 2018, after achieving promotion to La Liga, Carlos David terminated his contract with Huesca and signed for Royale Union Saint-Gilloise. Following one year in the Belgian First Division B, he cancelled the two remaining seasons of his contract and returned to Cartagena.

Carlos David helped the Efesé in their promotion to the second division with 20 appearances, but was only a backup option afterwards. On 16 July 2021, he agreed to a one-year deal with Segunda División RFEF side Hércules CF.

References

External links

1986 births
Living people
People from Mérida, Spain
Sportspeople from the Province of Badajoz
Spanish footballers
Footballers from Extremadura
Association football defenders
Segunda División players
Segunda División B players
Tercera División players
Valencia CF Mestalla footballers
Celta de Vigo B players
CD Teruel footballers
UD Melilla footballers
FC Cartagena footballers
SD Huesca footballers
Hércules CF players
Belgian Pro League players
Challenger Pro League players
Royal Excel Mouscron players
Royale Union Saint-Gilloise players
Spanish expatriate footballers
Expatriate footballers in Belgium
Spanish expatriate sportspeople in Belgium